Heather Myles (born July 31, 1962) is an American country music singer, with a honky tonk Bakersfield sound.

Early life
Myles was born in Riverside, California, United States, where her parents bred and trained horses for racing.  Heather had a job in the family business until the lure of the honky-tonks called her away.

While still in her teens, she joined a band, and within a year they had a contract with HighTone.

Career
Myles has released five studio albums, including two on HighTone, two on Rounder, and one on the Me and My Americana Roots label.

Her 1992 debut album Just Like Old Times contained mostly original compositions, along with songs from Jim Lauderdale and Robert Cray, and was followed by Untamed in 1995.

Her third studio album Highways and Honkytonks was released in 1998, and featured a duet with Merle Haggard on "No One is Gonna Love You Better."

2002's Sweet Talk & Good Lies included a duet with Dwight Yoakam on the song "Little Chapel."

Released in 2009, In The Wind was co-produced by Taras Prodaniuk (Dwight Yoakam, Lucinda Williams) who also played bass. They were accompanied by Larry Mitchell and Jim Christie (drums), and Bob Gothar (guitar).

Discography

Studio albums
 1992: Just Like Old Times (HighTone)
 1995: Untamed (HighTone) released on Demom in Europe
 1998: Highways and Honky Tonks (Rounder))
 2002: Sweet Talk and Good Lies (Rounder)
 2009: In the Wind (Me and My American Roots) also released in 2011 by Ah Ha Music Group

Live albums
 1996: Sweet Little Dangerous (Demon)
 2008: Live @ Newland, NL (Me and My American Roots)
 2013: Live on TruCountry (Floating World Records)

Compilations 
 2005: Rum and Rodeo (HighTone)

Singles

Music videos

References

External links
Heather Myles official site
 
 
Review of "Just Like Old Times"
Review of "Highways & Honky Tonks"

1962 births
American country singer-songwriters
American women country singers
Living people
Rounder Records artists
Musicians from Riverside, California
Singer-songwriters from California
Country musicians from California
21st-century American women